"Sunshine" is a song and single by rapper/dancer Rye Rye featuring M.I.A. It was recorded in 2008 and released in 2010 and serves as the first single from her debut album Go! Pop! Bang! (2012). The release on N.E.E.T. Recordings (via Interscope Records) was followed by an extended play of remixes, including work by The Cataracs, 12th Planet, MSTRKRFT, and L.A. Riots. The song also appeared in the episode "While You Weren't Sleeping" of the TV series Gossip Girl. and The Bling Ring.

Music video
'The clip celebrates Rye Rye's urban upbringing, with b-girl dance moves, double dutching, and pick-up games. The video is the second video of Rye Rye's to feature M.I.A., after her debut video "Bang". Contrary to sources' claims, the video was not shot in Rye Rye's hometown of Baltimore instead the video was shot by director Jess Holzworth, in the Greenpoint area of Brooklyn, NY.

Track listings and formats

Single
 "Sunshine" (featuring M.I.A.) – 3:22

The Remixes EP
"Sunshine" (JFK of MSTRKRFT Remix) [featuring M.I.A.] – 3:57
"Sunshine" (12th Planet Remix) [featuring M.I.A.] – 3:12
"Sunshine" (L.A. Riots Remix) [featuring M.I.A.] – 7:15
"Sunshine" (The Cataracs Remix) [featuring M.I.A.] – 2:50

Credits
Producer – M.I.A.
Mixed by Egyptian Lover 
Recorded by M.I.A.

References

External links
Rye Rye at MySpace
Rye Rye official website
Rye Rye at Interscope

Electronic songs
Rye Rye songs
M.I.A. (rapper) songs
Songs written by M.I.A. (rapper)
2010 singles
2010 songs
N.E.E.T. Recordings singles
2008 songs